Pardomima amyntusalis is a moth in the family Crambidae. It was described by Francis Walker in 1859. It is found in the Democratic Republic of the Congo (Equateur, Katanga), Ivory Coast, Kenya, Madagascar, Mozambique, Sierra Leone, Uganda, Zambia, Sri Lanka, India, Indonesia (Java), Myanmar and Australia, where it has been recorded from Western Australia.

References

Moths described in 1859
Spilomelinae